Alan Spence (born 7 February 1940), is an English footballer who played as an inside forward in the Football League.

References

External links

1940 births
Living people
English footballers
Sportspeople from Seaham
Footballers from County Durham
Association football forwards
Sunderland A.F.C. players
Darlington F.C. players
Southport F.C. players
Oldham Athletic A.F.C. players
Chester City F.C. players
English Football League players